(March 24, 1141 – September 27, 1207/October 25, 1208) was a famous soldier who served the Genji (Minamoto) clan during the Heian period of Japanese history. Kumagai is particularly known for his exploits during the Genpei War, specifically for killing the young warrior Taira no Atsumori at the battle of Ichi-no-tani in 1184. Later in life he became a Jōdo-shū Buddhist priest, as a disciple of Hōnen. Atsumori's death and the circumstances surrounding it went on to be fictionalized and retold in numerous forms, including the Heike Monogatari epic, a number of Noh plays, and in the jōruri and kabuki theatres as well.

Birth and origins

Kumagai was born in Kumagai village, in the Ōsato District of Musashi Province. He lost his father at a young age, and was raised by his maternal uncle, Hisaka Naomitsu. When Minamoto no Yoritomo first raised his army, Kumagai sided with the Taira clan (Heike). However, he soon switched allegiances to the Minamoto clan (Genji). Kumagai's most well-known battle was at Ichi no Tani, where he confronted the Heike prince, Taira no Atsumori.

Atsumori and Ichi-no-tani

During the battle of Ichi-no-Tani, Atsumori and Kumagai met on the beach at Suma, as the main Genji force approached and the Heike fled to their ships.  As it is told in the Heike Monogotari, Kumagai caught up with Atsumori, who was fleeing on horseback.  Kumagai managed to throw Atsumori from his horse and ripped off the helmet of the prone Atsumori.  It was then that Kumagai realized that he had caught a young prince, based on the fine makeup and robes.  Atsumori then tells Kumagai to take his head, but Kumagai hesitates because Atsumori reminded him of his own son, roughly the same age. Kumagai wished to spare Atsumori's life, due to his kind nature, but saw that his fellow Genji soldiers were approaching.  Tearfully he promises to recite prayers to Atsumori, and cuts off his head.

The Noh play Atsumori describes Atsumori's death as follows:

After taking the time to look through Atsumori's belongings, he found a certain flute, known as the "Saeda" (Little Branch). Discovering that the flute was given to Taira no Tadamori by Emperor Toba, and later passed down to Atsumori, he reportedly felt even more sadness and regret for his actions. That morning, Kumagai had heard someone playing the flute with skill outside the enemy camp, and he now realized that that flute player may have been Atsumori.

Priesthood 

Later in life, Kumagai remained remorseful over the people he killed in his career as a soldier, and grew discontented with following Minamoto no Yoritomo, so he visited the Pure Land Buddhist Hōnen and explained that he was concerned with the afterlife. Hōnen told him that he need only recite the name of Amida Buddha, the nembutsu, and that regardless of his former life, he would be reborn in the Pure Land.  Kumagai was said to have burst into tears, fearing that Hōnen would instruct him to "cut off his hands and feet or give up his life" in order to find salvation from his sins.

From there, Kumagai became a close follower of Hōnen and Jōdo-shū Buddhism, and took the ordained named Rensei (蓮生).  Letters are still preserved between Hōnen and Rensei, where Hōnen advises Rensei to continue reciting the nembutsu, and to look after his aging mother.  Rensei later made a written vow before a statue of Amida Buddha, stating that he would strive to reach the highest rebirth in the Pure Land, as depicted in the Buddhist text, the Contemplation Sutra:

As a close disciple of Hōnen, Rensei became a popular instructor on Pure Land Buddhism and helped spread the new doctrine to others who also became Hōnen's disciples.  In the summer of 1206, Rensei/Kumagai died one morning while repeating the nenbutsu over and over in front of a hung image of Amida Buddha and his attendant Bodhisattvas.

References

Further reading 

 

Minamoto clan
1141 births
1207 deaths
People of Heian-period Japan
People of Kamakura-period Japan
Jōdo-shū Buddhist priests
Kamakura period Buddhist clergy